Edwin C. Metcalfe was a saxophonist and manager of WPTA, who lived in Roanoke, Indiana.

Prior to entering the television broadcasting business, Metcalfe was a professional musician. In the 1940s, Metcalfe sang and played woodwinds with the legendary Spike Jones band.

Upon his 1974 arrival in Fort Wayne, Metcalfe brought showmanship and sparkle to a tired WPTA news operation, and that, combined with a generous budget, catapulted the station from third place behind the older WANE-TV and WKJG-TV stations, to first place for local news in the Fort Wayne, Indiana market.

Metcalfe attended the University of Pittsburgh and was awarded an honorary doctorate by Indiana Tech.

His wife of more than 50 years, Margaret Tootie Metcalfe, died in December 2000. They had two children, Judith Metcalfe Hampton and R. Duane Metcalfe. Metcalfe is retired and lives in Arizona.

References

American male saxophonists
Living people
Place of birth missing (living people)
People from Huntington County, Indiana
Year of birth missing (living people)
Musicians from Fort Wayne, Indiana
21st-century American saxophonists
21st-century American male musicians